USS Ostrich (AMc-51) was an Accentor-class coastal minesweeper acquired by the U.S. Navy.

It was the second ship to be named Ostrich by the Navy, and was laid down 6 February 1941, by the Herreschoff Mfr. Co. Bristol, Rhode Island; launched 29 March 1941 and placed in service 14 July 1941.

World War II service 
 
After completion of fitting out, Ostrich departed Boston, Massachusetts, 29 July and sailed for Hampton Roads, Virginia, where she arrived 31 July and reported to Commandant, 5th Naval District for type training at Yorktown, Virginia.

Operating out of New Orleans 

She operated out of New Orleans for the remainder of the war and until placed out of service on 27 December 1945 at Norfolk, Virginia.

Deactivation 

She was struck from the Naval Vessel Register 21 January 1946 and transferred to the Maritime Commission on 21 March 1947 for disposal.

References

External links 
 Dictionary of American Naval Fighting Ships
 NavSource Online: Mine Warfare Vessel Photo Archive - Ostrich (AMc 51)

Accentor-class minesweepers
World War II minesweepers of the United States
Ships built in Bristol, Rhode Island
1941 ships